Peñas del Chache is the highest altitude of the island of Lanzarote, Canary Islands, Spain, with a height of 672 meters above sea level. It is located in the north of the island, in the municipality of Haría.

Toponymy
The term Chache is of probably of Guanche origin. As for its possible meaning, the philologist Maximiano Trapero has proposed its translation as 'the height'.

Characteristics
Peñas del Chache is a rocky mountain located in the Famara massif. The top is occupied by an installation of the Air Surveillance Squadron.

Geology
Peñas del Chache is a basaltic intrusive formation dating from the Miocene period, and is part of the Famara volcanic edifice, one of the oldest massifs on the island.

Vegetation
The surroundings of the Peñas del Chache were characterized by thickets of the Canarian thermophilic forest in the past. However, historical human activity has caused its near disappearance, finding itself dominated by substitution thickets such as bitter tabaibal in modern times, dominated by the wild spurge Euphorbia regis-jubae, and the tojio thickets Asteriscus intermedius and Lavandula dentata.

Archeological sites
Nearby, archaeological remains of the ancient inhabitants of Lanzarote, the majos, have been found.

References

External links 

Mountains of the Canary Islands
Geography of the Province of Las Palmas
Lanzarote